Promphong Kransumrong (Thai พร้อมพงษ์ กรานสำโรง), born September 25, 1985, is a Thai footballer as a striker.

External links
Profile at clubwebsite.co.uk
Profile at thaisoccernet.com
Thai-Division-One Topscorer at thai-fussball.com
Profile at EnglishUDFC.com

1985 births
Living people
Promphong Kransumrong
Promphong Kransumrong
Promphong Kransumrong
Promphong Kransumrong
Promphong Kransumrong
Association football forwards
Promphong Kransumrong
Promphong Kransumrong